"Big Little Baby" is the first 7" single by The Reverend Horton Heat. It was released in 1988 on Four Dots Records.  It is the only recording to feature the band's original lineup of Heath, Barton, and Baranowski.

Track listing
"Big Little Baby"
"Bullet"

Personnel
Reverend Horton Heat (Jim Heath) - vocals, guitar
"Swingin'" Jack Barton - upright bass
Bobby Baranowski - drums

1988 singles
The Reverend Horton Heat songs
1988 songs